Dame Ann Parker Bowles  (née de Trafford; 14 July 1918 – 22 January 1987) was a British aristocrat and Girl Guides leader.

Background
Ann de Trafford was born in 1918 in London, the eldest daughter of millionaire racehorse owner Sir Humphrey de Trafford, 4th Baronet, and the Hon. Cynthia Hilda Evelyn Cadogan, a daughter of Henry Cadogan, Viscount Chelsea. The de Trafford Baronets descend from a pre-Conquest-founded line of recusant (a term coined to describe the minority of English people who remained Roman Catholic during and after the English Reformation in a time of religious persecution) lords of the manor who were wealthy in the Middle Ages and restored to hereditary title in the mid-19th century.  Ann (later Dame Ann) continued to adhere to the religion of her family, Roman Catholicism.

Honours
Ann de Trafford was a Commissioner of the Commonwealth Girl Guides Association. For these and other services to the Commonwealth she was invested as Commander of the Order of the British Empire (CBE) in 1972, and, five years later, as a Dame Commander of the Royal Victorian Order (DCVO) in 1977.

Marriage and children
On 14 February 1939 she married Derek Henry Parker Bowles, son of Eustace Parker Bowles (born Eustace Parker) and Wilma Mary Garnault Bowles, only daughter of Sir Henry Ferryman Bowles, 1st Baronet. They had four children:

 Brigadier Andrew Henry Parker Bowles (b. 27 December 1939)
 Simon Humphrey Parker Bowles (b. 6 November 1941)
 Mary Ann Parker Bowles (b. 9 June 1945)
 Richard Eustace Parker Bowles (b. 7 November 1947 – d. 2010)

Her eldest son Andrew was the first husband of Camilla, Queen Consort.

References

External links
British Pathé Online Archive coverage of her wedding
Biodata
The Peerage.com

1918 births
1987 deaths
British Roman Catholics
British socialites
Dames Commander of the Royal Victorian Order
Daughters of baronets
Girlguiding officials
Place of birth missing
Place of death missing
20th-century Roman Catholics
Ann
Ann
De Trafford family
20th-century British businesspeople